A stasis  or stasis field, in science fiction, is a confined area of space in which time has been stopped or the contents have been rendered motionless.

Overview
A stasis field is imagined to be a region in which a stasis process is in effect. Stasis fields in fictional settings often have several common characteristics. These include infinite or nearly infinite rigidity, making them "unbreakable objects" and a perfect or nearly-perfect reflective surface. Most science fiction plots rely on a physical device to establish this region. When the device is deactivated, the stasis field collapses, and the stasis effect ends.

Time is often suspended in stasis fields. Such fields thus have the additional property of protecting non-living materials from deterioration. This time dilation can be, from an in-universe perspective, absolute;  something thrown into the field, has the field triggered and then reactivated, would fly out as if nothing had happened. Storylines using such fields often have materials as well as living beings surviving thousands or millions of years beyond their normal lifetimes. The property also allows for such plot devices as booby traps, containing, for instance, a nuclear bomb. Once out of the stasis field, the trap is sprung. In such a situation, to avoid the protagonist from seeing what is in the field, the story line would not allow normal beings to see something protected by a stasis field.

One use of stasis fields is as a form of suspended animation: to let passengers and cargoes (normally of spacecraft or sleeper ships) avoid having to experience extremely long periods of time by "skipping over" large sections of it. They may also be used, such as in The Night's Dawn Trilogy, as protection against the effects of extreme acceleration.

There are real phenomena that cause time dilation similar that of a stasis field. Extremely high velocities approaching light speed or immensely powerful  gravitational fields such as those existing near the event horizons of black holes will cause time to progress more slowly. However, there is no known theoretical way of causing such time dilation independently of such conditions.

Examples
The Dune series of novels refers to "nullentropy" containers, where food is preserved indefinitely, as well as entropy-free "no-chambers" or "no-ships" which are undetectable to prescience.

The noted science fiction author Larry Niven used the concept of stasis fields and stasis boxes to a great extent directly or indirectly throughout his many novels and short stories set in the Known Space series. Niven's stasis fields followed conductive surfaces when established, and the resulting frozen space became a completely invulnerable and perfectly reflective object. They were often used as emergency protective devices. They could also be used to create a weapon called a variable sword, a length of extremely fine wire in a stasis field that makes it able to easily cut through normal matter. For more information, see Slaver stasis field.

A more limited form of stasis field is the "bobble", found in Vernor Vinge's Peace Authority setting. A bobble is always perfectly spherical and exists for a fixed period of time that is set when the bobble is first created. The duration of a bobble effect cannot be changed. Bobble generators were initially used as weapons, removing their targets from the field of combat.

Another example of a stasis field exists in Joe Haldeman's The Forever War, where stasis field generators are carried by troops to create conditions where melee weapons become the only viable means of combat. Inside the field, no object can travel faster than 16.3 m/s, which includes electrons, photons, and the field itself. Soldiers inside the field must be wearing suits with a special coating, or all electrical activity within their body would stop and the soldiers would die. In the novel, the main character defeats an enemy army, which has besieged a small remaining contingent of human troops on a moon, by arming a nuclear bomb inside the field and then moving the field away from the bomb. Once the bomb is revealed, its electrical activity resumes, and it promptly detonates. That vaporises the surrounding army, and a large chunk of the ground beneath the field. The soldiers emerge some days later to see if their trick worked and find themselves alone at the bottom of a large crater, their enemy destroyed.

In Peter F. Hamilton's The Night’s Dawn trilogy (1996-1999), “zero-tau pods” — powered containers inside which time halts — are an important narrative device.

In the computer strategy game StarCraft, the Arbiter unit can, through a combination of Protoss technology and the Arbiter's psionic power, create a stasis field that traps all units in the affected area in blue "crystals" of stopped time, taking them out of the fight and rendering them invulnerable for 30 seconds, thus allowing both offensive and defensive applications.

The Dead Space series has the main character Isaac Clarke carry a wrist-mounted tachyon-based stasis module, used to slow enemy Necromorphs to a crawl for a short period of time. He adapted its use to fight Necromorphs; it was used previously by technicians to slow down malfunctioning equipment that moves at dangerously high speeds, such as doors. Medical use of the technology is later seen in Dead Space 2, with stasis beds; the protagonist had also been kept in stasis for the majority of the time between games.

The game Mass Effect has a biotic power simply called "Stasis" that can trap an enemy in a stasis field rendering them immobile as well as invincible to all forms of damage. The duration of this effect is usually dependent on the user's skill level.

In the Star Wars RPG series Knights of the Old Republic, Jedi who follow the path of the light are able to use "Stasis" powers, using the force to alter time and freeze an enemy in place. Unlike true stasis, this stasis allows external events to affect the victim so someone held by stasis can be killed while unable to retaliate. The original game also uses a similar effect when Dark Jedi trap party members to engage the player in a duel.

In the Justice League Unlimited episode "The Cat and the Canary", Green Arrow uses a stunner to put himself into a form of stasis while fighting Wildcat. It was an attempt to end Wildcat's cage fighting career by falsely convincing him he killed Green Arrow during their fight.

In the Invader Zim episode "Walk For Your Lives", Zim creates a time stasis field and uses it on Dib as an experiment to show to the Tallest, as a result Dib can move only very slowly. Also produced is an explosion, which is also exploding very slowly, Zim decides to throw Dib into the explosion to cause it to speed up. The explosion then explodes at normal speed. 

In the animated series, Generator Rex, the main antagonist, Van Kleiss, is transported in time to Ancient Egypt during an accident. During his time there, he creates a stasis chamber but is awoken at multiple points throughout history before finally returning to the present in the episode "A History of Time". 

The Space themed MMO Eve Online features a weapon called a stasis webifier. When activated against an enemy ship it reduces the target's speed, making them easier to hit and keep in range. The weapon affords no protection to its target, and multiple 'webs' can be used on a ship at once, effectively stopping it dead.

In Half-Life, the protagonist Gordon Freeman is put into a state of Stasis after a brief discussion with the G-Man. A similar incidence happens to Adrian Shepherd at the end of Half Life: Opposing Force, when the G-Man puts him into a state of stasis "for further evaluation".

In Portal, Chell, the protagonist, is dragged away at the end of the game and put in stasis for many years, until she is awakened at the beginning of Portal 2.

In Project Eden one character is frozen in stasis for 15 years. Stasis can also be used offensively to slow down enemies.

In the first episode of Red Dwarf, "The End", third-class technician of the mining ship "Red Dwarf", Dave Lister, is put into a stasis booth as punishment for not revealing the whereabouts of his unquarantined cat. However, during his time in stasis, lethal radiation leaks into the ship as a result of a malfunction, killing all the crew (aside from his cat, which was in the cargo hold). Lister is then revived three million years later by the ship's computer, Holly, when the high radiation levels have subsided.

In Catherine Asaro's Skolian Empire books, the Skolians use quasis to freeze time during interstellar travel.

The 2008 novel The Last Colony describes a "sapper field" technology which can be set to modify various energetic properties of objects, such as weapons, notably by slowing projectiles down.

The 2012 Expanse series of novels describes a "slow zone" of outer space where no kinetic technological process is allowed to operate above a set speed, allowing organic life to operate normally but instantaneously slowing any over-speeding artifact or kinetic component thereof down to that speed.

In the cartoon series of Amphibia, shows one of the supporting characters, Marcy Wu being encapsulated by King Andrias in a state of suspended animation after getting killed by him and will be revealed to be possessed by Andrias's master at some point first shown in the official season 3 trailer and will possibly become a dangerous threat to Anne and other characters.

In The 100, during season 5, a group of prisoners awakes from cryopreservation after a little more than 100 years. They were on penal labor on a ship mining asteroids, but were put into cryopreservation for this period when the Earth had become temporarily uninhabitable.

See also
Force field (physics)
Force field (technology)
Tractor beam

References

Science fiction themes
Fictional technology
Time in fiction